Pickle Street is an unincorporated community in Lewis County, West Virginia, United States, on U.S. Route 33 along Leading Creek.  It is mostly a residential area, but it has an auction house.

Etymology 
At a general store near Pickle Street, but before it was established, asking for pickles was a code for whiskey.

References 

 Coleman West Virginia Atlas & Gazetteer
 Names of Towns and Cities in WV

Unincorporated communities in West Virginia
Unincorporated communities in Lewis County, West Virginia